Crambus bigelovi is a moth in the family Crambidae. It was described by Alexander Barrett Klots in 1967. It is found in North America, where it has been recorded from New Mexico and Wyoming.

References

Crambini
Moths described in 1967
Moths of North America